Dehmennatali (also Romanized as Dehmennatʿalī) is a village in Zirtang Rural District, Kunani District, Kuhdasht County, Lorestan Province, Iran. At the 2006 census, its population was 196, in 35 families.

References 

Towns and villages in Kuhdasht County